The 2014–15 Colorado State Rams men's basketball team represented Colorado State University during the 2014–15 NCAA Division I men's basketball season. The team was coached by Larry Eustachy in his third season. They played their home games at the Moby Arena on Colorado State University's main campus in Fort Collins, Colorado and were members of the Mountain West Conference. They finished the season 27–7, 13–5 in Mountain West play to finish in third place. They advanced to the semifinals of the Mountain West tournament where they lost to San Diego State. They were invited to the National Invitation Tournament where they lost in the first round to South Dakota State.

Previous season
The Rams finished the season with an overall record of 16–16, 7–11 in Mountain West play to finish in a tie for eighth place. They lost in the first round of the Mountain West Conference tournament to Utah State.

Departures

Incoming Transfers

Recruiting

Roster

Schedule and results 

|-
!colspan=9 style="background:#00674E; color:#FFC44F;"| Exhibition

|-
!colspan=9 style="background:#00674E; color:#FFC44F;"| Non-conference regular season

|-
!colspan=9 style="background:#00674E;"| Mountain West regular season

|-
!colspan=9 style="background:#00674E;"| Mountain West tournament

|-
!colspan=9 style="background:#00674E;"|NIT

Rankings

See also
2014–15 Colorado State Rams women's basketball team

References 

Colorado State
Colorado State Rams men's basketball seasons
Colorado State
Colorado State Rams
Colorado State Rams